The American Civil Liberties Union (ACLU)  has been involved in the following legal cases, either by representing a party, or filing an amicus brief, or otherwise significantly involved.

1920s
1925
 Tennessee v. Scopes (Scopes Trial) - paid for John Scopes' defense
 Gitlow v. New York,  - represented Benjamin Gitlow

1927
 Whitney v. California,

1930s
1931
 Stromberg v. California,  - represented Yetta Stromberg

1932
 Powell v. Alabama,  - represented the Scottsboro Boys

1933
 United States v. One Book Called Ulysses

1935 
 Patterson v. Alabama

1937
 De Jonge v. Oregon,  - represented Dirk De Jonge

1938
 Lovell v. City of Griffin

1939
 Hague v. CIO, .

1939
 Bolanos v. California - represented Wesley Packard

1940s
1940
 Cantwell v. Connecticut

1941
 Edwards v. California

1942
 Betts v. Brady

1943
 Hirabayashi v. United States,  - Amicus curiae for Gordon Kiyoshi Hirabayashi
 West Virginia State Board of Education v. Barnette,  - Amicus curiae 
 Martin v. Struthers

1944
 Korematsu v. United States
 Smith v. Allwright

1946
 Hannegan v. Esquire

1947
 Everson v. Board of Education,  - Amicus curiae for Arch R. Everson

1948
 Shelley v. Kraemer

1950s
1951
 Kunz v. New York

1952
 Joseph Burstyn, Inc. v. Wilson
 Rochin v. California

1954
 Brown v. Board of Education,  - Amicus curiae for Oliver Brown
Hernandez v. Texas, 347 U.S. 475 (1954) civil rights
1957
 Roth v. United States,  - Amicus curiae for Samuel Roth
 Watkins v. United States
 Yates v. United States,  - Amicus curiae for Yates

1958
 Kent v. Dulles
 Speiser v. Randall,  - ACLU lawyer Lawrence Speiser defended himself
 Trop v. Dulles

1959
 Smith v. California

1960s
1961
 Mapp v. Ohio,  - Amicus curiae for Dollree Mapp 
 Poe v. Ullman

1962
 Engel v. Vitale,  - represented Steven I. Engel

1963
 Abington School District v. Schempp,  - represented Edward Schempp
 Gideon v. Wainwright,  - Amicus curiae for Clarence Earl Gideon

1964
 Baggett v. Bullitt
 Carroll v. Princess Anne County
 Escobedo v. Illinois,  - Amicus curiae for Danny Escobedo
 Jacobellis v. Ohio
 New York Times Co. v. Sullivan,  - Amicus curiae for The New York Times
 Reynolds v. Sims,  - represented B.A. Reynolds

1965
 Griswold v. Connecticut,  - Amicus curiae for Estelle T. Griswold 
 Lamont v. Postmaster General
 United States v. Seeger,  - Amicus curiae for Seeger, Jakobson and Peter

1966
 Bond v. Floyd
 Miranda v. Arizona,  - Amicus curiae for Ernesto Miranda

1967
 Keyishian v. Board of Regents
 Loving v. Virginia
 Whitus v. Georgia

1968
 Epperson v. Arkansas,  - Amicus curiae for Susan Epperson
 Jones v. Mayer,  - Amicus curiae for Joseph Lee Jones 
 King v. Smith
 Levy v. Louisiana
 Terry v. Ohio,  - Amicus curiae for John W. Terry
 Washington v. Lee

1969
 Brandenburg v. Ohio,  - represented Clarence Brandenburg
 Gregory v. Chicago
 Street v. New York 
 Tinker v. Des Moines Independent Community School District,  - represented the Tinker and Eckhardt families
 Watts v. United States

1970s
1970
 Goldberg v. Kelly

1971
 Cohen v. California,  - Amicus curiae for Paul Robert Cohen
 New York Times Co. v. United States,  - Amicus curiae for The New York Times and The Washington Post
 Organization for a Better Austin v. Keefe
 Reed v. Reed,  - represented Sally Reed
 United States v. Vuitch

1972
 Eisenstadt v. Baird,  - Amicus curiae for William Baird
 Furman v. Georgia,  - Amicus curiae for William Furman, Lucious Jackson and Elmer Branch 
 Laird v. Tatum, 408 U.S. 1

1973
 Roe v. Wade, 
 Doe v. Bolton,  - represented "Mary Doe"
 Frontiero v. Richardson,  - Amicus curiae for Sharron Frontiero
 Schlesinger v. Holtzman
 Miller v. California,  - Amicus curiae for Marvin Miller

1974
 Communist Party of Indiana v. Whitcomb
 Smith v. Goguen
 United States v. Nixon,  - Amicus curiae against Richard Nixon

1975
 O'Connor v. Donaldson
 Taylor v. Louisiana

1976
 Buckley v. Valeo

1977
 Wooley v. Maynard

1978
 In re Primus
 National Socialist Party of America v. Village of Skokie,  - represented the National Socialist Party of America.  Also known as Smith v. Collin

1980s
1980
 Pruneyard Shopping Center v. Robins

1982
 Island Trees School District v. Pico
 New York v. Ferber,   - Amicus curiae for Paul Ferber
 McLean v. Arkansas

1983
 Bob Jones University v. United States
 City of Akron v. Akron Center for Reproductive Health, .

1985
 Wallace v. Jaffree,  - Amicus curiae for Ishmael Jaffree

1987
 Edwards v. Aguillard,  - represented Aguillard pro bono

1988
 Nelson v. Streeter - represented artist in Harold Washington portrait controversy

1989
 County of Allegheny v. ACLU,  - represented itself
 Texas v. Johnson,  - Amicus curiae for Gregory Lee Johnson
 United States v. Verdugo-Urquidez,  - Amicus curiae for Rene Martin Verdugo-Urquidez
 Webster v. Reproductive Health Services,

1990s
1990
 Cruzan v. Director of the Missouri Department of Health - represented Nancy Cruzan's family
 Employment Division v. Smith,  - Amicus curiae for Alfred Smith and Galen Black
 Hodgson v. Minnesota, .
 United States v. Eichman,  - Amicus curiae for Shawn Eichman

1991
 Rust v. Sullivan, .

1992
 Hudson v. McMillian
 Lee v. Weisman,  - Amicus curiae for Deborah Weisman
 Planned Parenthood v. Casey,  - represented Planned Parenthood of Southeastern Pennsylvania
 R. A. V. v. City of St. Paul,  - Amicus curiae for R. A. V.

1993
 J.E.B. v. Alabama ex rel. T.B.
 Wisconsin v. Mitchell

1994
 City of Ladue v. Gilleo

1995
 Capitol Square Review Board v. Pinett
 Church of Lukumi Babalu Aye v. City of Hialeah
 Hurley v. Irish-American Gay, Lesbian, and Bisexual Group of Boston
 McIntyre v. Ohio Elections Commission
 Miller v. Johnson, .
 Campaign for Fiscal Equity, Inc. v. State of New York,  - Amicus curiae

1996
 ACLU v. Zell Miller  - represented itself
 Romer v. Evans, .
 NOW v. Scheidler, - Amicus curiae

1997
 Reno v. ACLU, .

1999
 ACLU v. Schundler
 Hunt v. Cromartie,  - Amicus curiae

2000s
2000
 Stenberg v. Carhart,  - Amicus curiae
 Curley v. NAMBLA - represented NAMBLA pro bono
 Boy Scouts of America v. Dale,  - Amicus curiae
 City of Indianapolis v. Edmond

2002
 ACLU v. Ashcroft (2002)

2003
 State v. Dalton
 McConnell v. FEC
 Lawrence v. Texas,  - Amicus curiae
 Goodridge v. Department of Public Health - Amicus curiae
 Ayotte v. Planned Parenthood of New England - Amicus curiae
 United States v. American Library Association

2004
 ACLU v. Ashcroft (2004)
 ACLU v. Department of Defense - appellant
 Hamdi v. Rumsfeld - Amicus curiae
 Elk Grove Unified School District v. Newdow - Amicus curiae
 Rumsfeld v. Padilla - Amicus curiae
 Rasul v. Bush - Amicus curiae
 Locke v. Davey - Amicus curiae

2005
 Castle Rock v. Gonzales - Amicus curiae for Jessica Gonzales
Citizens for Equal Protection v. Bruning - Plaintiff alongside Citizens for Equal Protection and Nebraska Advocates for Justice Equality
 City of San Diego and Mt. Soledad Memorial Association v. Paulson - represented Philip Paulson
 McCreary County v. ACLU of Kentucky - ACLU defended itself
 The King’s English v. Shurtleff - represented King's English and others
 Kitzmiller v. Dover Area School District - represented eleven parents
 Varian v. Delfino - Amicus curiae for Michelangelo Delfino and Mary Day
 Gonzales v. Oregon - Amicus curiae for Oregon
 Rumsfeld v. Forum for Academic and Institutional Rights - Amicus curiae for Forum for Academic and Institutional Rights
 MGM v. Grokster - Amicus curiae in support of Grokster

2006
 Qassim v. Bush - Amicus curiae in support of Qassim
 ACLU v. NSA
 Howard v. Arkansas - represented Matthew Lee Howard and other plaintiffs

2007
 Morse v. Frederick - Amicus curiae in support of Frederick
 Gonzales v. Carhart and Gonzales v. Planned Parenthood - Amicus curiae in support of Carhart and Planned Parenthood

2008
 Abdel-Moniem El-Ganayni vs. the United States Department of Energy et al. - represented Dr. El-Ganayni pro-bono

2009
 In re Gill - represented Martin Gill
 Safford Unified School District v. Redding – represented respondent Redding

2010s
2010
Perry v. Schwarzenegger - Amicus curiae; private communications between officials in the organization were ordered to be released publicly as court evidence
Amnesty v. Blair -  Amicus curiae
Davis v. Billington
2013
Clapper v. Amnesty International
Missouri v. McNeely
United States v. Windsor

2015
Ingersoll v. Arlene's Flowers
ACLU and others v. NSA
Obergefell v. Hodges

2020s
2021
Mahanoy Area School District v. B.L.

Alphabetical 

 Abington School District v. Schempp
 Abrams v. United States
 ACLU v. NSA
 ACLU v. Schundler
 Ashcroft v. American Civil Liberties Union
 American Civil Liberties Union v. Ashcroft
 American Civil Liberties Union v. Department of Defense
 Ayotte v. Planned Parenthood of Northern New England
 Baggett v. Bullitt
 Betts v. Brady
 Bob Jones University v. United States
 Bond v. Floyd
 Boy Scouts of America v. Dale
 Brandenburg v. Ohio
 Brown v. Board of Education
 Buckley v. Valeo
 Cantwell v. Connecticut
 Capitol Square Review Board v. Pinett
 Carroll v. Princess Anne County
 Castle Rock v. Gonzales
 Church of Lukumi Babalu Aye v. City of Hialeah
 Citizens for Equal Protection v. Bruning
 City of Akron v. Akron Center for Reproductive Health
 City of Ladue v. Gilleo
 City of Indianapolis v. Edmond
 Cohen v. California
 Communist Party of Indiana v. Whitcomb
 County of Allegheny v. ACLU
 Nancy Cruzan
 Curley v. NAMBLA
 Davis v. Billington
 De Jonge v. Oregon
 Doe v. Bolton
 Edwards v. Aguillard
 Edwards v. California
 Eisenstadt v. Baird
 Abdel-Moniem El-Ganayni
 Elk Grove Unified School District v. Newdow
 Employment Division v. Smith
 Engel v. Vitale
 Epperson v. Arkansas
 Escobedo v. Illinois
 Everson v. Board of Education
 Frontiero v. Richardson
 Furman v. Georgia
 Gideon v. Wainwright
 Gitlow v. New York
 Goldberg v. Kelly
 Gonzales v. Carhart
 Gonzales v. Oregon
 Goodridge v. Department of Public Health
 Gregory v. Chicago
 Griswold v. Connecticut
 Hague v. Committee for Industrial Organization
 Hamdi v. Rumsfeld
 Hannegan v. Esquire
 Hirabayashi v. United States
 Hodgson v. Minnesota
 Howard v. Arkansas
 Hudson v. McMillian
 Hunt v. Cromartie
 Hurley v. Irish-American Gay, Lesbian, and Bisexual Group of Boston
 Ingersoll v. Arlene's Flowers
 In re Gill
 In re Primus
 Island Trees School District v. Pico
 Jacobellis v. Ohio
 J.E.B. v. Alabama ex rel. T.B.
 Jones v. Alfred H. Mayer Co.
 Joseph Burstyn, Inc. v. Wilson
 Kent v. Dulles
 Keyishian v. Board of Regents
 King v. Smith
 Kitzmiller v. Dover Area School District
 Korematsu v. United States
 Kunz v. New York
 Lamont v. Postmaster General
 Lawrence v. Texas
 Lee v. Weisman
 Levy v. Louisiana
 Locke v. Davey
 Lovell v. City of Griffin
 Loving v. Virginia
 Mahanoy Area School District v. B.L.
 Mapp v. Ohio
 Martin v. Struthers
 McConnell v. Federal Election Commission
 McCreary County v. ACLU of Kentucky
 McIntyre v. Ohio Elections Commission
 McLean v. Arkansas
 MGM Studios, Inc. v. Grokster, Ltd.
 Miller v. California
 Miller v. Johnson
 Miranda v. Arizona
 Morse v. Frederick
 Mount Soledad cross controversy
 National Organization for Women, Inc. v. Scheidler
 National Socialist Party of America v. Village of Skokie
 New York Times Co. v. Sullivan
 New York Times Co. v. United States
 New York v. Ferber
 O'Connor v. Donaldson
 Organization for a Better Austin v. Keefe
 Patterson v. Alabama
 Perry v. Schwarzenegger
 Planned Parenthood v. Casey
 Poe v. Ullman
 Powell v. Alabama
 Pruneyard Shopping Center v. Robins
 Qassim v. Bush
 R.A.V. v. City of St. Paul
 Rasul v. Bush
 Reed v. Reed
 Reno v. American Civil Liberties Union
 Reynolds v. Sims
 Rochin v. California
 Roe v. Wade
 Romer v. Evans
 Roth v. United States
 Rumsfeld v. Forum for Academic and Institutional Rights, Inc.
 Rumsfeld v. Padilla
 Rust v. Sullivan
 Scopes Trial
 Schlesinger v. Holtzman
 Shelley v. Kraemer
 Smith v. Allwright
 Smith v. Collin
 Smith v. California
 Smith v. Goguen
 Speiser v. Randall
 State v. Dalton
 Stenberg v. Carhart
 Street v. New York
 Stromberg v. California
 Taylor v. Louisiana
 Terry v. Ohio
 Texas v. Johnson
 The King's English v. Shurtleff
 Tinker v. Des Moines Independent Community School District
 Trop v. Dulles
 United States v. Eichman
 United States v. One Book Called Ulysses
 United States v. Nixon
 United States v. Seeger
 United States v. Verdugo-Urquidez
 United States v. Vuitch
 Varian v. Delfino
 Wallace v. Jaffree
 Washington v. Lee
 Watkins v. United States
 Watts v. United States
 Webster v. Reproductive Health Services
 West Virginia State Board of Education v. Barnette
 Whitney v. California
 Whitus v. Georgia
 Wisconsin v. Mitchell
 Wooley v. Maynard
 Yates v. United States

References

  ACLU list of successes
  New Hampshire ACLU: "100 greatest ACLU cases"

ACLU
ACLU
ACLU